Zuma may refer to:

People
 Zuma (surname), a South African surname
 Suma people, or Zuma people, people living in northern Chihuahua and the Rio Grande valley of western Texas

Fictional characters
 Zuma (comics), a Filipino comic book character
 Zuma, a character from PAW Patrol

Places
 Zuma Beach in Malibu, California
 Zuma Rock, in Nigeria
 Zuma, Sudan, an archaeological site

Entertainment
 Zuma (video game)
 Zuma (album), 1975, by Neil Young and Crazy Horse
 Zuma, a 1988 country rock album by Southern Pacific

Vehicles and transport
 Yamaha Zuma, motor scooter
 Yamaha Zuma 125, motor scooter
 Zuma, a small cat-rigged dinghy made by American Machine and Foundry (AMF)
 Zuma (satellite), a U.S. military satellite launched by SpaceX

Others
 Zuma (restaurant)
 Zuma Press, a US-based wire service
 Zuma (harvestman), a genus of arachnid in the family Paranonychidae